Giovanni di Francesco Toscani (1372 - 2 May 1430) was an Italian painter.

Born in Florence, he was the pupil of Giottino, in whose style he painted. His masterpiece is said to have been an Annunciation for a chapel of the Bishop's palace in Arezzo. It was restored by Agnolo di Lorenzo, and later by Vasari. Toscani was buried in Santa Maria del Fiore.

References

External links

Italian Paintings: Florentine School, a collection catalog containing information about Toscani and his works (see pages: 75–77).

1372 births
1430 deaths
14th-century Italian painters
Italian male painters
15th-century Italian painters
Painters from Florence
Quattrocento painters